The JoBlo Movie Network includes a website, JoBlo.com, which focuses on news, film reviews, and movie trailers; and YouTube channels that focus on trailers, movie clips, celebrity interviews, original content, and as film distribution.

Early days
Berge Garabedian (aka JoBlo) founded JoBlo.com in 1998 as a hobby to keep his writing skills sharp. His film reviews generally critiqued movies from the perspective of an average movie-goer. The site eventually hired other critics to write reviews. Garabedian himself wrote more than 1,400 reviews until health problems forced him to step back as the site's main critic in 2007. The website’s name is a play on "Joe Blow," and registered users of the website were known as "schmoes". The site also features news about movies, movie trailers, movie previews, and celebrity interviews.

In 2000, Berge asked his best friend John Fallon (aka The Arrow) to write about horror movies, leading to the site's "Arrow in the Head" section.

Also in 2000, JoBlo.com became one of the first websites to cover the San Diego Comic-Con. In 2005, it became one of the first movie fansites to cover the Cannes Film Festival.

In 2001, the site started holding an annual awards presentation for films that were most enjoyed by its visitors. The nominees are chosen by the sites’ visitors, as well as its final winners. These became known as "The Golden Schmoes". Often the winners of these awards were films that had large fan-bases, but limited critical praise. However, the 2021 awards which would have honored films released in 2020 were cancelled due to the impact of the COVID-19 pandemic on the film industry.

In 2002, JoBlo.com signed up for an ad representation deal on the Web with Gorilla Nation which lasted until 2010, when they switched over to Complex Networks (now part of Buzzfeed).

In 2007, Garabedian was invited to take part in the “Masters of the Web” panel at the SDCC alongside other popular movie fansites like ComingSoon.net, Dark Horizons, CHUD, Ain’t It Cool News, Collider and others.

In the 2000s, the site was praised in many publications. In 2006, Entertainment Weekly called it one of their “25 favorite online entertainment sites". In 2007, Time magazine called Garabedian one of the  “new tastemakers” in Hollywood. In 2001, USA TODAY called JoBlo.com one of the "Web's hottest fansites". In 2004, Variety said that "Websites like JoBlo.com and Ain’t-It-Cool-News, which were once 'renegades', are now courted heavily by publicists" and that JoBlo was considered an "E-frathouse; strident in its opinions but less reliant on the rumor mill". Maclean’s September 29, 2014, issue called JoBlo one of the “YouTube stars” who was “making the most of it”.

Many top filmmakers also became fans of the website over the years. Writer/director Kevin Smith wrote the foreword to Garabedian’s 2002 book, JoBlo.com presents the 50 Coolest Movies of All-Time in which Smith compared the film critic to a "good blowjob".

Since 2009 
In February 2009, JoBlo.com started a weekly podcast called The Good, The Bad, and The JoBlo Movie Podcast. Guests have included Bobcat Goldthwait, Duncan Jones, and Clifton Collins, Jr.

In 2009, JoBlo.com launched the movie community section called MovieFanCentral, which at its peak, had over 100,000 subscribers. The community was shut down in early 2018.

In 2010, Garabedian was interviewed for the documentary film The People vs George Lucas. That year, he created JoBlo Movie Productions to executive-produce several of his own films, including 2015's The Shelter and two documentaries Arcade Dreams and 1982: Greatest Geek Year Ever.

In 2011, in its 10th year covering the San Diego Comic Con, JoBlo and Latino Review threw a party at the Sway Lounge in downtown San Diego. Director Jon Favreau showed up to DJ and other noted guests included Olivia Munn, Aisha Tyler and Faizon Love.

In April 2013, JoBlo launched an app called "RELEASE Dates" which can be found on the iTunes store, as well as the Google store. It lists theatrical and Blu-Ray/DVD release dates.

Starting in 2019, JoBlo.com’s Editor-in-Chief Chris Bumbray has done weekly spots on the CTV NEWS channel regarding breaking movie news and movie reviews.

In the year 2021, JoBlo.com re-launched its website with a new look based on the Wordpress platform, with a new logo created by Disney artist Chris Uminga.

In January 2022, JoBlo announced that it would began to license full-length feature films to distribute on YouTube. John Fallon was promoted to Director, Original Content & Acquisitions.

Youtube channels 
The JoBlo Movie Network has numerous YouTube channels including:

Golden Schmoes Awards
The Golden Schmoes Awards have been held annually since 2001.

Categories 
Film

 Best Animated Movie of the Year (2001–present)
 Best Comedy of the Year (2001–present)
 Best Horror Movie of the Year (2001–present)
 Best Sci-Fi Movie of the Year (2001–present)
 Favorite Movie of the Year (2001–present)

Acting

 Best Actor of the Year (2001–present)
 Best Actress of the Year (2001–present)
 Best Supporting Actor of the Year (2001–present)
 Best Supporting Actress of the Year (2001–present)
 Breakthrough Performance of the Year (2001–present)

Technical

 Best Music in a Movie (2001–present)
 Best Screenplay of the Year (2001–present)
 Best Director of the Year (2002–present)
 Best Special Effects of the Year (2001–present)

Other

 Best Action Sequence of the Year (2001–present)
 Best DVD of the Year [renamed Best DVD/Blu-Ray in 2003] (2001–2019)
 Best Line of the Year (2001–present)
 Best T&A of the Year (2001–2019)
 Best Trailer of the Year (2001–present)
 Biggest Disappointment of the Year (2001–present)
 Biggest Surprise of the Year (2002–present)
 Coolest Character of the Year (2001–present)
 Favorite Celebrity of the Year (2001–present)
 Favorite Movie Poster of the Year (2001–present)
 Most Memorable Scene in a Movie (2001–present)
 Most Overrated Movie of the Year (2001–present)
 Most Underrated Movie of the Year (2001–present)
 Trippiest Movie of the Year (2001–present)
 Worst Movie of the Year (2001–present)

Ceremonies
2001 Awards

2002 Awards

2003 Awards

2004 Awards

2005 Awards

2006 Awards

2007 Awards

2008 Awards

2009 Awards

2010 Awards

2011 Awards

2012 Awards

2013 Awards

2014 Awards

2015 Awards

2016 Awards

2017 Awards

2018 Awards

2019 Awards

2021 Awards

2022 Awards

See also
 AICN
 Dark Horizons
 /Film (Slashfilm)
 The Movie Insider
 Box Office Mojo

Notes

References

External links 
 
 goldenschmoes.com award site

Canadian film websites
Internet properties established in 1998